Kiebitz is German for Lapwing, it may also refer to:

Focke-Wulf S 24 Kiebitz, a German sport aircraft of the 1920s
Italian ship Ramb III, seized by the Germans in World War II and renamed Kiebitz
Operation Kiebitz, a failed World War II attempt to free German prisoners of war
Platzer Kiebitz, a German homebuilt biplane design